Cropley is a light rail station operated by Santa Clara Valley Transportation Authority (VTA). This station is served by VTA's Orange Line.

The station was opened on June 24, 2004, as part of the second phase of VTA's Tasman East light rail extension.

Service

Location
Cropley station is located in the median of North Capitol Avenue near Cropley Avenue in San Jose, California.

Station layout

References

External links

Santa Clara Valley Transportation Authority light rail stations
Railway stations in San Jose, California
Railway stations in the United States opened in 2004
2004 establishments in California